The following is a list of number-one DVDs of 2009 in the United Kingdom.The highest selling home video formats in the UK are ranked by the Official UK Video/DVD Chart, which is published and compiled by The Official Charts Company, on behalf of the British Video Association. The chart ranks the weekly sales of video and DVD formats in 6,200 retailers across the UK.

Chart history

See also
British films of 2009
List of 2009 box office number-one films in the United Kingdom
UK DVD Chart

References

External links
British Video Association
Top 40 Videos Chart at The Official Charts Company
Archive of number-ones at The Official Charts Company
The Official Charts Company (OCC)

Number-one DVDs
2009 in British cinema